The Golden Ticket Award for Best New Roller Coaster is presented by Amusement Today to the best new roller coaster in the amusement park industry.

History
The Golden Ticket Awards have been presenting awards since 1998 acknowledging the amusement industry achievement in different categories. The Best New Roller Coaster award was introduced in 2019 and the first award was presented to Steel Curtain at Kennywood. From 2005 to 2018, new roller coasters were eligible for the Best New Ride (amusement park) category. In 2019, that category was divided up to showcase more new rides in the industry. The Best New Roller Coaster category honors the best roller coaster regardless of structural material.

Roller coaster recipients

References

External links
 Current Golden Ticket Awards at Amusement Today's Golden Ticket website

Golden Ticket Awards
 
Awards established in 2019